Asgaard is a beer brand of the Schleswig brewery, founded in 1994 in Schleswig-Holstein on the grounds of an old freight depot by Master Brewer Ronald T. Carius, who also opened it up with a gastro-pub named 'Luzifer'. The brewery is marketed and named after the Norse gods of Asgard, the Æsir, worshiped by the Viking Norse settlers in the Haithabu area during the Viking Age, and plays on the legend of the Æsir as heavy beer consumers. Unlike the honey beer of the Vikings however, Asgaard brews dark wheat beer that is treated with biological enzymes.

References

External links
 https://web.archive.org/web/20111027212454/http://www.asgaard.de/Dokumente/asgaard.htm

Beer brands of Germany